George Trimble House is a historic home located at Silver Spring Township in Cumberland County, Pennsylvania, United States. It was built in 1812, and is a two-story, five bay wide brick building with a stone foundation and rear kitchen ell. It has a Federal style interior.

It was listed on the National Register of Historic Places in 1992.

References 

Houses on the National Register of Historic Places in Pennsylvania
Federal architecture in Pennsylvania
Houses completed in 1812
Houses in Cumberland County, Pennsylvania
National Register of Historic Places in Cumberland County, Pennsylvania